is a passenger railway station located in the city of Yoshinogawa, Tokushima Prefecture, Japan. It is operated by JR Shikoku and has the station number "B09".

Lines
Besides local service trains, the Tsurugisan limited express service also stops at Kamojima.

Layout
The station consists of two opposed side platforms serving 2 tracks. A passing loop runs on the other side of platform 2 while a siding runs on the other side of platform 1, ending near the station building. The station building houses a shop, waiting room, a JR ticket window (without a Midori no Madoguchi facility) and a JR travel centre (Warp Plaza). Access to the opposite platform is by means of an old-style roofed footbridge.

Platforms

Adjacent stations

History
When the company was nationalized on 1 September 1907, Japanese Government Railways (JGR) took over control of the station and operated it as part of the Tokushima Line (later the Tokushima Main Line). With the privatization of Japanese National Railways (JNR), the successor of JGR, on 1 April 1987, the station came under the control of JR Shikoku. On 1 June 1988, the line was renamed the Tokushima Line.

Passenger statistics
In fiscal 2018, the station was used by an average of 1850 passengers daily.

Surrounding area
The area around the station is the center of former Kamojima Town
Yoshinogawa City Kamojima Elementary School
Kamojima Health Center
Yoshinogawa City Hall

See also
 List of Railway Stations in Japan

References

External links

 JR Shikoku officialhome page

Railway stations in Tokushima Prefecture
Railway stations in Japan opened in 1899
Yoshinogawa, Tokushima